The siege of Ta'if took place in 630, as the Muslims under the leadership of Muhammad besieged the city of Ta'if after their victory in the battles of Hunayn and Autas. One of the chieftains of Ta'if, Urwah ibn Mas'ud, was absent in Yemen during that siege. However, the city did not succumb to the siege. Muhammad brought trebuchets and testudos to use against the fortress, but was unable to penetrate it with these weapons.

Battle
Sunni sources state the following regarding the siege of Ta'if:

Abu Sufyan ibn Harb lost his first eye in the siege of Ta'if. He told Muhammad of his loss for God to which Muhammad said “Which would you prefer: An eye in heaven or shall I pray to Allah that He brings it back?” To this Abu Sufyan said he would rather have his eye in heaven. He lost his other eye in the Battle of Yarmouk.

Blockade of Ta'if
A few unsuccessful tries were made by Muhammad's forces to break through the gates of Ta'if. Muhammad may have even used the Roman Testudo formation in this siege, but it was reported that the inhabitants of Ta'if were able to break this siege by dropping hot irons upon the Muslim armies from the city walls. Muhammad allegedly told the people of Ta'if that he would burn and cut down their vineyard, as he saw no other way to make them surrender. Muhammad angered the citizens of Ta'if by offering freedom to slaves who surrendered themselves to Islam. However, only ten people were able to avail themselves of this option and become followers of Muhammad.

The siege went on for half a month with little change and soldiers became very impatient. Following consultation with advisors and a prophetic dream, Muhammad ended the siege and withdrew his forces.

To aid in the siege of Ta'if, Muhammad sought to get the chief of the Banu Hawazan (called Malik) on his side, and promised the release of his family and the return of all his property if Malik embraced Islam. Malik accepted the offer and became a Muslim, aiding Muhammad in his blockade of Ta'if. Malik disrupted the ability of the citizens of Ta'if to graze their cattle outside of the city, further increasing the difficulty of life inside the walls.

Aftermath
Although the siege was unsuccessful, Muhammad vowed to return to Ta'if after the sacred months in which fighting was forbidden were over. During this period, the inhabitants of Ta'if, the Banu Thaqif, sent a delegation to Mecca. They demanded that Muhammad let them continue to worship their goddess Al-lāt for a period of three years, yet had conspired to have him assassinated. When this conspiracy was discovered, and their ambush failed, Muhammad refused the proposal and would only accept their surrender if they agreed to disarm. Eventually the Banu Thaqif consented to Muhammad's request, so they then surrendered and allowed the Muslims into their city.

Participants
Abu Sufyan ibn Harb
Tufayl ibn Amr

References

Ta'if
Taif
Taif
Ta'if
Ta'if
630